The 2017 LA Galaxy II season was the club's fourth season of existence. The 2017 marks the first in LA Galaxy II club history that the team did not qualify for the USL Cup playoffs.

Players 
The squad of LA Galaxy II is composed of an unrestricted number of first-team players on loan to the reserve team, players signed by Galaxy II, and LA Galaxy Academy players. Academy players who appear in matches with LA Galaxy II will retain their college eligibility.

Squad information

Transfers

Transfers in

Transfers out

Competitions

Friendlies

USL

Standings

Regular season 
The first three LA Galaxy II matches was announced on January 27, 2017. The full schedule was released on January 31, 2017.

All times in Pacific Time Zone.

See also 
 2017 in American soccer
 2017 LA Galaxy season

References

External links 
 

LA Galaxy II seasons
LA Galaxy II
LA Galaxy II
LA Galaxy II